Prunus ssiori, the Hokkaido bird cherry or Japanese bird cherry, is a species of bird cherry native to northern Japan, Sakhalin Island, and the Kuril Islands. Some natural populations may occur on the far eastern mainland of Asia in Russia. Its specific epithet derives from its Ainu name, meaning "bitter".

Uses

Some cultivation of this species for its fruit is conducted by people in Japan and on Sakhalin. The Ainu and others use its wood for various crafts, such as hunting weapons, musical instruments, and furniture.

References

External links
 

Bird cherries
ssiori
Flora of Asia
Flora of China
Flora of Japan
Flora of Russia
Plants described in 1868